Vishnu Mathur (1934–2007) was an Indian film producer and director who had worked in North America, Europe, Middle East and South-East Asia .

His works include: India : The Lotus and The Cross, Firedance, The Courtesans of Bombay, and The Red Bindi. He was the winner of the prestigious UNESCO & HOT DOCS awards for Skin Deep: Science of Race(1).  He was also a recipient of the Golden Sheaf award of Berlin Festival, Britannia award, U.K., Red Ribbon Award, New York Film Festival, and various awards from Columbus & Yorkton Festivals.

Vishnu Mathur lived in Toronto, London, Singapore, Mumbai, Delhi and independently worked for the CBC, WGBH, Discovery Channel, BBC & Channel Four networks.

See also
Sarah Blaffer Hrdy

References

1- http://www.answers.com/topic/skin-deep-the-science-of-race

External links
http://www.netsap.org/saltaf2005/film.htm
http://www.visiontv.ca/Programs/documentaries_India_Lotus.html
http://osdir.com/ml/culture.region.india.goa.research/2005-03/msg00001.html
http://www.bullfrogfilms.com/catalog/phal.html
http://scout.wisc.edu/Reports/ScoutReport/2003/scout-030411-geninterest.html

Film directors from Mumbai
Film producers from Mumbai
1934 births
2007 deaths